Alien Lockdown, also known as Creature and Predatorman, is a 2004 American science fiction horror television film directed by Tim Cox. The screenplay by Ross Helford and T.M. Van Ostrand is from a story by John Thompson, Boaz Davidson, and Kenneth M. Badish. The film stars John Savage, James Marshall, and Michelle Goh.

Plot 

An ancient alien life force, after lying dormant for centuries, awakens with a hunger for humans. It is up to an elite SWAT team led by a fierce assassin to save mankind from a fate worse than death. For centuries, the extraterrestrial waited for human knowledge to evolve enough to unlock the source of its deadly potential.

When a mad scientist finally breaks the genetic code, a horde of mutant creatures begins to spawn, each a killing machine. Deep within a top-secret military base, a small army of soldiers attempts to exterminate the bloodthirsty beast, but with each life it takes, the creature grows  more powerful. Is it possible that mankind's place on the food chain has finally been challenged?

Cast
 John Savage as Dr. Alan Woodman
 James Marshall as Charlie Dryfus
 Michelle Goh as Commander Rita Talon
 T.M. Van Ostrand as Lieutenant Raymond Green
 Nathan Perez as Sal Meyer
 David Kallaway as Kerns
 Martin Kove as Colonel Anslow
 Atanas Srebrev as Temple
 Stanimir Stamatov as Hoog
 Raicho Vasilev as Monie
 Stanislav Dimitrov as Creature

References

External links 
 

2004 films
2004 horror films
2004 science fiction films
2004 television films
2000s monster movies
2000s science fiction horror films
American horror television films
American monster movies
American science fiction horror films
American science fiction television films
Films about extraterrestrial life
Films about scientists
Films shot in Bulgaria
Mad scientist films
Military science fiction films
Nu Image films
Syfy original films
2000s English-language films
Films directed by Tim Cox
Films produced by Boaz Davidson
Films with screenplays by Boaz Davidson
2000s American films